The Jiayuguan Solar Park is a 52 MWp photovoltaic power station located in the Jiayuguan City region, in China. It uses fixed tilt arrays. The first stage, 40 MWp, was completed in 2012.

See also

List of photovoltaic power stations
Photovoltaic power station
Photovoltaics

References

Photovoltaic power stations in China
Jiayuguan City